Filippo "Pippo" Della Vite (born 4 October 2001) is an Italian alpine skier.

Career
During his career, he has achieved four results among the top 15 in the FIS Alpine Ski World Cup.

World Cup results
Top 15

World Championship results

References

External links
 
 

2001 births
Living people
Italian male alpine skiers
Alpine skiers of Fiamme Oro
Sportspeople from Bergamo